The Mermaid Inn is a Grade II* listed historical inn located on Mermaid Street in the ancient town of Rye, East Sussex, southeastern England. One of the best-known inns in southeast England, it was established in the 12th century and has a long, turbulent history. The current building dates from 1420 and has 16th-century additions in the Tudor style, but cellars built in 1156 survive. The inn has a strong connection with the notorious Hawkhurst Gang of smugglers, who used it in the 1730s and 1740s as one of their strongholds: Rye was a thriving port during this period. Some of the smugglers, their mistresses and other characters are reported to haunt the inn.

The AA Rosette-winning restaurant serves British and French cuisine and features medieval-style artwork in the interior by the Slade School of Fine Art. It has been owned by Judith Blincow since 1993.

Geography
The Mermaid Inn is located on Mermaid Street, which was once the town's main road. Mermaid street of present day, must have been the Middle street of 1670. Middle Street used to include the present Mermaid and Middle streets; in fact, the original Middle street was the present Mermaid street, as the Mermaid Inn is described, by William Holloway writing in the 19th century, as abutting on the south towards that street. The inn is situated on the north side of Mermaid street, and abutted to Middle Street towards the south. Other close by establishments, which were also used by the Hawkhurst Gang, included the London Trader Inn, the Flushing Inn, and the Olde Bell Inn.

History

Early years
The cellars of the Mermaid Inn date from 1156, believed to be the year that the original inn was built, or shortly afterwards: Nikolaus Pevsner and English Heritage identified them as 13th-century. In its original form, the building was constructed of wattle and daub, lath and plaster. It was a notable alehouse during medieval times, brewing its own ale and charging a penny a night for lodging. The inn became popular with sailors who came to the port of Rye, and the port also provided ships for the Cinque Ports Fleet.

In the 1420s, the inn was rebuilt but retained its cellars. It underwent further renovation in the 16th century, much of which remains today. Between 1550 and 1570, the Town Corporation organised many functions such as the "Sessions Dinner", the "Gentlemens Freeman's Dinner", "Mayoring Day" and the "Herring Feast". Queen Elizabeth I was also a guest at the inn around this time.

The inn had a strong connection with the notorious Hawkhurst Gang which used the premises during the 1730s and 1740s. This large group of smugglers controlled territory from Kent to Dorset from their base at the Oak and Ivy Inn in Hawkhurst, but they used the Mermaid Inn as a secondary location. There are a myriad of secret tunnels, including one which ran from the cellars to the Old Bell Inn (built 1390) in The Mint, a street which runs parallel to the north of Mermaid Street. A revolving cupboard at the end of the tunnel in the Olde Bell would then be used by the gang for a quick getaway. A resident of Rye remembered the smugglers as; "when the Hawkhurst Gang were at the height of their pride and insolence having seen them (after successfully running a cargo of goods on the seashore), seated at the windows of this house (the Mermaid) carousing and smoking their pipes, with their loaded pistols lying on the table before them; no magistrate daring to interfere with them".

By 1770, the building ceased functioning as an inn. By 1847, it was in use as a house and was owned by Charles Poile; the yard at the back, through which there was a footway leading to High Street, was called the Mermaid Yard.

Later years
The inn functioned as a club in 1913, after it came under the ownership of May Aldington, mother of the novelist Richard Aldington. It was then a popular locale for many artists like Dame Ellen Terry, Lord Alfred Douglas (Oscar Wilde's "Bosie"), A.C. and E.F. Benson and Rupert Brooke. In 1945, during World War II, the inn functioned as a garrison for Canadian officers. It was later purchased by Mr L. Wilson, a Canadian, who had been garrisoned there. The Mermaid Inn had the honour of hosting a luncheon to Her Majesty the Queen Mother when she was named as the Lord Warden of the Cinque Ports during her visit to Rye in 1982.

Under the name Mermaid House and The Mermaid Hotel, the Mermaid Inn was listed at Grade II* by English Heritage on 12 October 1951. This defines it as a "particularly important" building of "more than special interest". As of February 2001, it was one of 75 Grade II* listed buildings, and 2,106 listed buildings of all grades, in Rother—the local government district in which Rye is located. The Mermaid Inn is presently owned by Judith Blincow and Robert Pinwill, who bought it in 1993.

In late 1982, the exterior of the inn was used in the post Monty Python film Yellowbeard, alongside its neighboring church square and infamous cobbled Mermaid Street leading to the inn. The film turned out to be Marty Feldman's last ever project, after he died in Mexico during production.

Architecture and fittings

The black and white timber-framed and tiled building, with dark oak and carved stone chimney pieces, was constructed in the mid-15th century; the author of Old Sussex Inns identifies 1426 as the date. Some of the timber was taken from ships that had been broken up. The south-facing elevation, the oldest section apart from the cellars, has a five-window range to the upper storey and attic space above. The upper storey is jettied, and the section to the west extends over the entrance to the inner courtyard and former stable area. This overhang is supported on wooden columns with brackets and cross-beams. The north-facing section, beyond courtyard, is also timber-framed but with brick facing and infilling. It rises to two storeys with two windows on each and a dormer above. This, and the east and west ranges, are 16th- and 18th-century. The tiled roof has one gable end.

The chimney is made of Caen stone and embellished with decorations. The secret passages that existed in the inn have now been converted into fireplaces. The Giant's Fireplace Bar features an inglenook fireplace which is supported by a beam that traverses the room. Other low panelled rooms, contain large Tudor fireplaces and dog grates (a freestanding basket grate intended to hold wood for the fireplace). Monogram, names and dates are carved on the stone fireplaces, including "1643", "1646", and "Loffelholtz". Some of the chairs are elaborately carved and were made from ships' timbers.

There are 31 rooms, each of different design, spread over several floors. Eight bedrooms have 4-poster beds. The bathrooms are fitted with modern amenities. The ceiling has thick and dark teak wood beams while the windows are made of lead frames. Diamond-paned windows are situated at the back. The floors creak.

Haunting

The Mermaid Inn is well known for its hauntings and has been subject to an investigation by Most Haunted. The events in one room have been described as "one of the most well-organised ghostly scenarios anywhere". Room 16 (Elizabethan) was said to be the scene of a duel involving two men "of unknown date and origin" (although they have also been described as wearing "16th-century clothing"). After fighting through some of the nearby rooms, one of the men was killed, dragged into the adjacent room and thrown through a trapdoor into the dungeon below. Many unexplained light anomalies have been recorded in the middle of the night. On one occasion an employee was tending to the fireplace when all of the bottles on the bottle shelf at the other end of the room fell off; the experience caused him to resign. The ghost of a maid is said to be present in the inn; she was the girlfriend of one of the smugglers of the Hawkhurst Gang and was killed by his fellow gang members as they feared she knew too much and would expose them.

References

Notes

Bibliography

 [Archive.org version ]

 (Now in the public domain.)

External links

Official site
Reviews: TripAdvisor The Times Beer In The Evening

Hotels in East Sussex
Tudor architecture
1156 establishments in England
Grade II* listed pubs in East Sussex
Rye, East Sussex
Reportedly haunted locations in South East England
East Sussex folklore
Timber framed pubs in England